Fernando Isern (born September 22, 1958) is a Cuban-born prelate of the Roman Catholic Church. Formerly a pastor and high school president in the Archdiocese of Miami, he served as bishop of the Diocese of Pueblo in Colorado from 2009 to 2013.

Biography

Early life and education
Fernando Isern was born on September 22, 1958, in Havana, Cuba.  In 1963, his family moved to Venezuela and then in 1967 to Miami, Florida. Isern graduated from Champagnat Catholic School in Hialeah, Florida, in 1977. After high school, he attended Miami Dade College and then Florida International University, both in Miami, where he graduated in 1982 with a Bachelor of Arts degree in business administration. After graduation, Isern got a job in marketing with First National Bank of Miami, promoting the introduction of ATM machines

While working at First National, Isern started seriously considering the priesthood. He began spending time at St. John Vianney College Seminary in Miami, eventually enrolling there.  He also studied at St. Vincent de Paul Regional Seminary in Boynton Beach, Florida.

Ordination and Ministry
Isern was ordained to the priesthood for the Archdiocese of Miami on April 16, 1993. He then served as a parochial vicar at St. Mark Parish in Southwest Ranches, Florida. In 1996, Isern was transferred to St. Elizabeth of Hungary Parish in Pompano Beach, Florida.

In 1999, Isern became an adjunct professor at St. Vincent de Paul Regional Seminary, assistant chaplain for the archdiocesan Youth Center and for Encuentros Juveniles. He was also appointed as parochial vicar at St. Agnes Parish in Key Biscayne, Florida. In 2002, Isern was sent to Our Lady of Lourdes Parish  in Miami as parochial vicar. In 2003, he was appointed pastor of that parish. From 2008 to 2009, Isern also served as president of Archbishop Coleman F. Carroll High School in Miami. He is affiliated with the Schoenstatt Movement.

Bishop of Pueblo, Colorado
On October 15, 2009, Isern was appointed the fourth bishop of the Diocese of Pueblo by Pope Benedict XVI. Isern received his episcopal consecration on December 10, 2009, at an arena at Colorado State University-Pueblo. His principal consecrator was Archbishop Charles J. Chaput,; the principal co-consecrators were Archbishop John C. Favalora and Bishop Arthur N. Tafoya. Isern was the 11th priest from the Archdiocese of Miami to become a bishop. As bishop, Isern instituted perpetual adoration at the Shrine of Saint Therese in Pueblo.

Retirement 
On June 13, 2013, Pope Francis accepted Isern's resignation due to poor health as bishop of the Diocese of Pueblo. Currently Isern is celebrating masses in Miami. This includes Good Shepherd Catholic Church.

See also
 

 Catholic Church hierarchy
 Catholic Church in the United States
 Historical list of the Catholic bishops of the United States
 List of Catholic bishops of the United States
 Lists of patriarchs, archbishops, and bishops

References

External links
 Roman Catholic Diocese of Pueblo Official Site

 

 

1958 births
Living people
People from Havana
Florida International University alumni
Roman Catholic Archdiocese of Miami
Cuban emigrants to the United States
Roman Catholic bishops of Pueblo
21st-century Roman Catholic bishops in the United States
Religious leaders from Florida